Passing by Behind Your Eyes is the third studio album by the American electronic music producer Pretty Lights, released on October 6, 2009 by Pretty Lights Music. It is the second album by the project to only have Smith. The album was first released as a free download from the Pretty Lights Music website.

Track listing

Credits
Design, Layout – Michal Menert
Mastered By – Geoff Pesche
Producer – Derek Vincent Smith

Notes
All tracks produced and engineered for Pretty Lights Music Inc.
Mastered at Abbey Road Studios.

References

Albums free for download by copyright owner
Pretty Lights albums